Péter Fülöp (24 March 1914 – 15 September 2004) was a Hungarian diplomat, who served as Hungarian Charge d'Affaires ad interim to the United States in 1971. He was the Consul General of the Hungarian Embassy in New York City from 1974 to 1976. He was the Ambassador to Norway from 1979 to 1983.

References

Sources

External links
 Diplomatic Representation for Hungary
 Történelmi Tár - Fülöp Péter

1914 births
2004 deaths
Hungarian diplomats
Hungarian politicians
Hungarian communists
Ambassadors of Hungary to the United States
Ambassadors of Hungary to Norway